G0511 Deyang–Dujiangyan Expressway (Chinese:德都高速公路, 德都高速) is a part of Chengdu Economic Zone Ring Expressway, starting from Deyang City in Sichuan Province, the way Shifang, Pengzhou, only in Dujiangyan City, Sichuan Province.

Expressways in Sichuan
0511